2007 Punjab Legislative Assembly election for the constitution of the Thirteenth Legislative Assembly of Punjab was held in the Indian state of Punjab.

The term of the twelfth Punjab assembly  ended with its dissolution in March 2007. The dissolution was necessitated after the results of the election was declared.

Committees

Members of the Punjab Legislative Assembly
The following is the list of the members of the Punjab Vidhan Sabha.

References

13th
2007 establishments in Punjab, India